KLDR (98.3 FM) is a radio station broadcasting an Adult Top 40 music format. Licensed to Harbeck-Fruitdale, Oregon, United States, the station serves Southern Oregon, including Grants Pass, Medford, and the Illinois Valley.  The station is currently owned by Grants Pass Broadcasting Corp.

History
The station came on the air in 1991 as KAJO-FM, an FM simulcast of AM 1270 KAJO.

In 1992, the simulcast was discontinued, as the station became “The Leader” KLDR, with a more gold-based Adult Contemporary format.  The first song played on KLDR was “Africa” from Toto.  Within a couple of years after its launch, KLDR moved in the direction of Adult Top 40.

Translators
KLDR broadcasts on the following translators:

References

External links
Official website
KLDR Facebook

Adult top 40 radio stations in the United States
Grants Pass, Oregon
LDR
1991 establishments in Oregon